Bingham Road railway station, on the Great Northern and London and North Western Joint Railway, was one of two stations serving the town of Bingham, Nottinghamshire.

History
It opened in 1879 and closed to regular traffic in 1951. The other station, Bingham on the Great Northern Railway Grantham to Nottingham line, is still open.

Station masters
J. Price
F.C.B. Baxter 1921 - 1934 (afterwards station master at Caythorpe)
A. Smith 1934 - 1937 (also station master at Bingham, afterwards station master at Loughborough Central)

References

Disused railway stations in Nottinghamshire
Railway stations in Great Britain opened in 1879
Railway stations in Great Britain closed in 1951
Former Great Northern Railway stations
Former London and North Western Railway stations
Bingham, Nottinghamshire